Antonov built product 181 was a Soviet experimental aeroplane rolled-out at the end of the 1980s.

History
The Antonov An-181 (or product 181) project was terminated due to the lack of funds following the collapse of the Soviet Union. An interesting feature of the plane is its unusual arc-shaped wing, a so-called Channel wing. The aircraft has two seats next to each other, a tricycle fixed landing gear configuration, a V-tailplane, and high-wing equipped with a channel wing in the area of the propellers. Power from the engine is delivered by means of drive shafts and deflection gearboxes to the two-blade propellers. The aircraft received the registration СССР-190101 and is exhibited in the State Museum of Aviation of Ukraine. Willard Ray Custer had previously built aeroplanes with the same wing concept in the USA.

Specifications
General characteristics
 Crew: 2 people
 Length: 7,31 m
 Wingspan: 7,3 m
 Height: 2,5 m
 Wing area: 7 m²
 Normal take-off weight: 820 kg
 Maximum take-off weight: 900 kg
 Engine: AP LOM M-337A, 6 cylinders, 103 kW
 Propeller diameter: 1.5 m
 Maximum speed: 225 km / h
 Practical range: 530 km
 Service height: 4200 m
 Starting distance: 70 m
 Landing distance: 80 m

See also

References

Sources

 Antonov X plane

1980s Soviet experimental aircraft
V-tail aircraft
An-181
High-wing aircraft
Channel-wing aircraft
Single-engined twin-prop tractor aircraft